Mark Peter Fletcher (born 29 September 1985) is a British politician serving as the member of Parliament (MP) for Bolsover since 2019. He is a member of the Conservative Party.

Early life
Fletcher grew up in Doncaster, South Yorkshire, attending Ridgewood School. The first in his family to go to university, he studied land economy at Jesus College, Cambridge, and was president of the Cambridge University Students' Union.

Career
Fletcher worked in the House of Lords as the chief of staff to the prime minister's trade envoy to Uganda and Rwanda, Dolar Popat, as well as for the private healthcare company Synergix Health.

At the 2015 general election he stood in the Doncaster North constituency against Labour party Leader Ed Miliband. Two years later, Fletcher was the candidate in Stockton North, where he achieved an 8.5% increase in the Conservative vote share but lost nonetheless.

Fletcher also contested the local government elections in May 2018 for Tower Hamlets London Borough Council, coming second out of three Conservative candidates in the diverse three-member ward of Whitechapel. He gained 274 votes. 

Fletcher was chosen as the candidate for Bolsover in the 2019 general election. He defeated incumbent Labour politician Dennis Skinner, who had held the seat since the 1970 general election. Fletcher was one of two former Tower Hamlets 2018 Conservative council candidates to have won a marginal seat in the 2019 election, the other being Gedling's Tom Randall, who had stood in Canary Wharf ward.

Fletcher was involved in an effort to reopen a disused railway line in Ashfield District.

Fletcher resigned from his position as Parliamentary Private Secretary (PPS) to the Department for Business, Energy and Industrial Strategy following the Chris Pincher scandal, stating in his resignation letter that he was the MP who reported Pincher to the chief whip. On 26 September 2022 Fletcher was appointed PPS to Kwasi Kwarteng, the chancellor of the Exchequer.

Political views
Fletcher is a supporter of Brexit, voting to leave the European Union in the 2016 referendum.

Fletcher has been critical of the BBC, saying its employees and coverage "look down on working class communities in the North and Midlands. The coverage of Brexit was borderline farcical, wall-to-wall coverage of anti-British stories and negativity".

Personal life
Fletcher is openly gay. He is married to Will Knock.

References

External links

1985 births
Living people
UK MPs 2019–present
Gay politicians
English LGBT politicians
LGBT members of the Parliament of the United Kingdom
Conservative Party (UK) MPs for English constituencies
Alumni of Jesus College, Cambridge
British Eurosceptics